Daiji may refer to:

 Daiji (era), Japanese era name
 Daiji, a set of kanji for numerals used in legal and financial documents to prevent forgeries
 Daiji, Iran, a village in Khuzestan Province, Iran
 Daiji, Nepal, a village development committee in Kanchanpur District, Nepal

People with the given name
Daiji Morii (born 1967), Japanese tennis player
Daiji Takahashi (born 1977), Japanese mixed martial artist
, Japanese basketball player
Daiji Kurauchi (1913), Japanese field hockey player

Japanese masculine given names